Trevor Andrew Manuel (born 31 January 1956) is a South African politician who served in the government of South Africa as Minister of Finance from 1996 to 2009, during the presidencies of Nelson Mandela, Thabo Mbeki and Kgalema Motlanthe, and subsequently as Minister in the Presidency for the National Planning Commission from 2009 to 2014 under former President Jacob Zuma.

Early life
Trevor Manuel was born in Kensington (Cape Town), during the apartheid era and was classified as a Cape Coloured. His mother, Philma van Söhnen, was a garment factory worker, and his father, Abraham James Manuel, was a draughtsman. According to Manuel's "family legend", his great-grandfather was a Portuguese immigrant; he had married 

Manuel grew up and was educated in the city. He matriculated from the Harold Cressy High School in 1973 and studied Civil and Structural Engineering, and later, during his detention, law.

Public life
Manuel entered public life in 1981 as the General Secretary of the Cape Areas Housing Action Committee, after which he became a National Executive member of the United Democratic Front (UDF). In September 1985 Manuel was detained and then banned until 31 August 1990. However, Manuel's ban was lifted on 25 March 1986 after it was ruled that it was not in line with the provisions of the Internal Security Act. On 15 August 1986 Manuel was again detained under the emergency regulations for almost two years until July 1988. He was released from detention under severe restrictions but promptly detained again in September 1988, this time until February 1989. His release came with stringent restriction orders.

Post-apartheid

After the unbanning of the African National Congress (ANC), Manuel was appointed as deputy co-ordinator in the Western Cape Province. At the ANC's first regional conference in 1990 Manuel was elected publicity secretary. At the ANC's 1991 national conference Manuel was elected to the National Executive Committee. In 1992 Manuel became head of the ANC's Department of Economic Planning. Manuel was elected as an ANC Member of Parliament in 1994 and was appointed by President Nelson Mandela as Minister of Trade and Industry; two years later, in 1996, he was moved to the post of Minister of Finance.

The World Economic Forum selected Manuel as a "Global Leader for Tomorrow" in 1994, and he has received numerous international awards and recognition for his accomplishments.

South Africa reported its first budget surplus in 2007. A combination of increased prosperity, high commodity prices and a wider tax base were credited with the surge of revenue. Manuel increased spending for education, housing and sanitation.

In the 2002 election to the ANC's National Executive Committee, Manuel placed first. At the ANC conference in Polokwane in December 2007, he was again elected to the National Executive Committee, this time in 57th place with 1,590 votes. In April 2008 Manuel was announced chancellor of the Cape Peninsula University of Technology.

In September 2008, the International Monetary Fund commissioned a "Committee on IMF Governance Reform", to be chaired by Manuel. This report was submitted in March 2009.

According to papers seen by The Citizen, Manuel allegedly approved a contract on modernisation at the SA Revenue Service (Sars), worth R100 million, currently standing at R1 billion, without following due processes.

In August 2017, HAWK reportedly asked Trevour Manuel and Pravin Gordhan to provide an affidavit on setting up SARS intelligence unit to spy on politicians.

Resignation and re-appointment

On 23 September 2008, Trevor Manuel resigned as Finance Minister along with a number of other cabinet members after the resignation of President Thabo Mbeki, unsettling the financial market, but it was subsequently announced that he would be willing to continue to serve under the next president. Manuel explained the resignation as a principled gesture, and he expressed surprise at the market's reaction. He was retained in his post in the cabinet of Mbeki's successor, Kgalema Motlanthe, which was announced on 25 September.

Public spat with Jimmy Manyi
On 2 March 2011, Manuel published an open letter to Jimmy Manyi, the spokesperson for the South African government, in which he accused him of racism and compared him to Hendrik Verwoerd. This letter was precipitated by the remarks that Manyi made about a change in the labour laws he had proposed in his previous position of Director-General of Labour. These changes affect the racial quota that employers in South Africa are to apply to their work force. Previously they needed to reflect the ethnic composition of the local community; this would now be changed to the composition of the country as a whole. Such a change would have severe consequences for the Coloured community of the Western Cape as well as for the Indian community of KwaZulu-Natal. For the former only 10% of jobs would be available in regions where they form a 60% majority. Manyi claimed that there was a "surplus" of Coloureds in the West-Cape and that this 'problem' should be solved by making the members of this community spread over other provinces—a solution similar to that of relocation under apartheid.

Manuel's sharp reaction to Manyi's remarks provoked an equally sharp response from Paul Ngobeni, a prominent backer of Jacob Zuma and John Hlophe.

African Union Covid-19 special envoy and EFF spat 

In April 2020, Cyril Ramaphosa, President of South Africa and Chairperson of the African Union, appointed Manuel as a special envoy in view of the COVID-19 epidemic. The Economic Freedom Fighters (EFF) criticised his appointment, alleging that he was a 'puppet' of 'white monopoly capital'. Previously, Manuel had successfully pursued a case for defamation against the EFF in the Johannesburg High Court, after they alleged that he was corruptly involved in the selection of the commissioner of the South African Revenue Service.

Personal life
Trevor Manuel married Lynne Matthews in 1985. The couple had three sons Govan, Pallo and Jaime. The couple separated in 2001 and divorced in 2007. Manuel then married Maria Ramos on 27 December 2008 at the age of 52.

Controversy 
The Hawks indicted Manuel and his one-time deputy, Jabu Moleketi, to provide affidavits on the creation of a special investigative unit in the South African Revenue Service (SARS) that allegedly spied on politicians. The National Prosecuting Authority (NPA) has been probing the unit in an investigation in which former finance minister Pravin Gordhan was summoned.

See also 

 List of people subject to banning orders under apartheid

References

External links

1956 births
Living people
Politicians from Cape Town
Cape Coloureds
South African people of Portuguese descent
Commission for Africa members
Finance ministers of South Africa
Members of the National Assembly of South Africa
African National Congress politicians